Thomas Elliot Bowman III (October 21, 1918 – August 10, 1995) was an American carcinologist best known for his studies of isopods and copepods.

Bowman was born and grew up in Brooklyn, New York. He graduated from Kent School in Kent, Connecticut in 1937 and Harvard College in 1941. During the Second World War, he spent four years in the U.S. Army, gaining a degree in veterinary medicine from the University of Pennsylvania. Afterwards, he went to the University of California, Berkeley, where he gained a master's degree, and then worked at the Scripps Institution of Oceanography, where he gained a Ph.D. (awarded by the University of California, Los Angeles).

During his career, Bowman wrote 163 papers, using a style which has been likened to that of Ernest Hemingway and Albert Camus. As well as describing 116 new species (including 55 isopods, 28 copepods, one suctorian and one chaetognath), 16 genera and one order, Mictacea, Bowman also produced significant works on the structural homology of the telson and the evolution of stalked eyes.

Taxa

Several taxonomic names recognise Thomas Bowman:
Apseudes bowmani Gutu & Iliffe, 1989
Bahalana bowmani Ortiz & Lenana, 1997
Cymbasoma bowmani Suárez-Morales & Gasca, 1998
Halicyclops bowmani Da Rocha & Iliffe, 1993
Hansenium bowmani (Kensley, 1984)

Taxa named by Bowman include:
Antrolana Bowman, 1964
Antrolana lira Bowman, 1964
Bermudalana aruboides Bowman & Iliffe, 1983
Dolobrotus mardeni T. E. Bowman, 1974
Lirceus usdagalun Holsinger & Bowman, 1973
Mexilana saluposi Bowman, 1975
Mexistenasellus nulemex Bowman, 1982
Mictacea Bowman, Garner, Hessler, Iliffe & Sanders, 1985
Mictocarididae Bowman & Iliffe, 1985
Mictocaris Bowman & Iliffe, 1985
Mictocaris halope Bowman & Iliffe, 1985
Remasellus Bowman & Sket, 1985
Sphaerolana karenae Rodriguez-Almaraz & Bowman, 1995
Thermosphaeroma cavicauda Bowman, 1985
Thermosphaeroma macrura Bowman, 1985
Thermosphaeroma milleri Bowman, 1981
Thermosphaeroma smithi Bowman, 1981

References

American carcinologists
1918 births
1995 deaths
Harvard College alumni
Kent School alumni
University of Pennsylvania School of Veterinary Medicine alumni
University of California, Berkeley alumni
University of California, Los Angeles alumni
People from Brooklyn
20th-century American zoologists
Scientists from New York (state)